Euphemystic is the first full-length album by American band Son, Ambulance.

It is the 36th release from Saddle Creek Records.

Track listing
"An Instant Death" – 6:38
"An Instant Birth" – 2:55
"Seven Days" – 1:39
"A Book Laid On Its Binding" – 3:14
"Maria In Motion" – 5:13
"The Anonymous" – 4:20
"Like A Friend " – 4:55
"I Promise You'll Never Grow Old" – 5:12
"A New Dress For Maybell" – 4:16
"Violet" – 4:49

References

2001 albums
Son, Ambulance albums
Saddle Creek Records albums